Kariz-e Bedaq (also Romanized as Kārīz-e Bedāq and Kārīz-e Bedāgh) is a village in Qalandarabad Rural District, Qalandarabad District, Fariman County, Razavi Khorasan Province, Iran. At the 2006 census, its population was 111, in 27 families.

References 

Populated places in Fariman County